Aiouea is a genus of shrubs and trees in the family Lauraceae. It is native to tropical forests and montane forests of North and South America. The name is a curiosity because it consists entirely of vowels.

Taxonomy
The following species are currently recognized:

 Aiouea acarodomatifera Kosterm.
 Aiouea alainii (C.K.Allen) R.Rohde
 Aiouea amoena (Nees & Mart.) R.Rohde
 Aiouea amplexicaulis (Schltdl. & Cham.) R.Rohde
 Aiouea ampullacea Lorea-Hern.
 Aiouea angulata Kosterm.
 Aiouea areolata (Lundell) R.Rohde
 Aiouea baitelloana (van der Werff & P.L.R.Moraes) van der Werff & P.L.R.Moraes
 Aiouea benthamiana Mez
 Aiouea bracteata Kosterm.
 Aiouea bractefoliacea (Lorea-Hern.) R.Rohde
 Aiouea breedlovei (Lundell) R.Rohde
 Aiouea brenesii (Standl.) R.Rohde
 Aiouea chavarriana (Hammel) R.Rohde
 Aiouea chiapensis (Lundell) R.Rohde
 Aiouea cinnamomoidea (Lorea-Hern.) R.Rohde & Lorea-Hern.
 Aiouea dubia Mez
 Aiouea effusa (Meisn.) R.Rohde & Rohwer
 Aiouea elegans (van der Werff) Rohwer
 Aiouea erythropus (Nees & Mart.) R.Rohde
 Aiouea formicaria (van der Werff & Lorea-Hern.) R.Rohde
 Aiouea glaziovii (Mez) R.Rohde
 Aiouea glossophylla (Lorea-Hern.) R.Rohde
 Aiouea grandifolia van der Werff
 Aiouea guatemalensis (Lundell) Renner (Damburneya guatemalensis)
 Aiouea guianensis Aubl.
 Aiouea hammeliana (W.C.Burger) R.Rohde
 Aiouea hartmanii (I.M.Johnst.) R.Rohde
 Aiouea hatschbachii (Vattimo-Gil) R.Rohde
 Aiouea haussknechtii (Mez) R.Rohde
 Aiouea heteranthera (Ruiz & Pav.) R.Rohde
 Aiouea hirsuta Lorea-Hern.
 Aiouea impressa (Meisn.) Kosterm.
 Aiouea kruseana (O.Téllez & Villaseñor) R.Rohde
 Aiouea laevis (Nees ex Mart.) Kosterm.
 Aiouea lanigera (van der Werff) R.Rohde
 Aiouea lehmannii (O.C.Schmidt) Renner
 Aiouea leptophylla (Lorea-Hern.) R.Rohde
 Aiouea longipes (I.M.Johnst.) R.Rohde
 Aiouea longipetiolata van der Werff
 Aiouea macedoana Vattimo
 Aiouea maguireana (C.K.Allen) Renner
 Aiouea maya Lorea-Hern.
 Aiouea montana (Sw.) R.Rohde
 Aiouea myristicoides Mez
 Aiouea napoensis (van der Werff) R.Rohde
 Aiouea neurophylla (Mez & Pittier) R.Rohde
 Aiouea obscura van der Werff
 Aiouea opaca van der Werff
 Aiouea pachypoda (Nees) R.Rohde
 Aiouea padiformis (Standl. & Steyerm.) R.Rohde
 Aiouea palaciosii (van der Werff) R.Rohde
 Aiouea paratriplinervis Lorea-Hern.
 Aiouea parvissima (Lundell) Renner (Damburneya parvissima)
 Aiouea piauhyensis (Meisn.) Mez
 Aiouea pittieri Rohwer
 Aiouea pseudoglaziovii Lorea-Hern.
 Aiouea rubrinervia Lorea-Hern.
 Aiouea salicifolia (Nees) R.Rohde
 Aiouea saligna Meisn.
 Aiouea sellowiana (Nees & Mart.) R.Rohde
 Aiouea stenophylla (Meisn.) R.Rohde
 Aiouea subsessilis (Meisn.) R.Rohde
 Aiouea taubertiana (Mez & Schwacke) R.Rohde
 Aiouea tetragona (Meisn.) R.Rohde
 Aiouea tomentella (Mez) Renner
 Aiouea tomentosa (Meisn.) R.Rohde
 Aiouea tonduzii (Mez) R.Rohde
 Aiouea trinervis Meisn.
 Aiouea uninervia Lorea-Hern.
 Aiouea velveti (Lorea-Hern.) R.Rohde
 Aiouea zapatae (Lorea-Hern.) R.Rohde

References

 
Lauraceae genera
Neotropical realm flora
Taxonomy articles created by Polbot
Taxa named by Jean Baptiste Christian Fusée-Aublet